Denisa Allertová was the defending champion, but she chose to participate at the 2015 Porsche Tennis Grand Prix instead.

Shahar Pe'er won the title, defeating Kristýna Plíšková in the final, 1–6, 7–6(7–4), 7–5.

Seeds

Main draw

Finals

Top half

Bottom half

References 
 Main draw

Lale Cup - Singles
Lale Cup